The fifth season of The Voice of Albania aired from 9 January 2016 to 16 April on Top Channel. The show is still hosted by Ledion Liço who has hosted the series since series one. Three judges have remained the same (Alma Bektashi, Sidrit Bejliri & Genc Salihu) while there is one new judge - Jonida Maliqi, Vodafone Albania continued to sponsor the series and used the slogan "Power to your Voice!"

Blind auditions
Each coach has the length of the artists' performance to decide if they want that artist on their team. Should two or more coaches want the same artist, then the artist will choose their coach.

Episode 1 (9 January)
The series premiere was broadcast on 9 January 2016.
Colour key

Episode 2 (11 January)

Episode 3 (16 January)

Episode 4 (18 January)

Episode 5 (23 January)

Episode 6 (25 January)

Battle rounds
The battle rounds will consist of two 2 hour shows on 30 January and 20 February. In a change from previous series, the coaches' chairs will turn around after each performance to face away from the stage so that in the event of steal they turn back around to face the contestants.

Colour key

Episode 1 (30 January)

Episode 2 (6 February)

Episode 3 (13 February)

Episode 4 (20 February)

References

Series 5
2016 Albanian television seasons